Église protestante de Balbronn is a Lutheran church (EPCAAL) in Balbronn, Bas-Rhin, Alsace, France. Originally dated to the 12th century, it became a registered Monument historique in 1990.
It contains the prosthetic hand and arm of Knight Hans von Mittelhausen.

Registered objects
The church contains many items that are registered as historical objects:
A Bronze Bell (1552)
A Bronze Bell (2) (1846)
A Prosthetic Hand and Arm (copy) (1552)
The Furniture in the Church
An Organ (1747)
A Chalice with Paten and Protestant Host Box (1895)
A Protestant Chalice with Paten (19th century)
2 Communion Ewers (18th century)
A Baptismal Basin and Ewer (1887)
A Protestant Begging Trunk (15th century)
A Pastoral Chair (20th century)
A Stained glass window: Frédéric Barberousse (1908)
A Stained glass window: Christ in Glory (1908)
A Funeral Monument for Euphrosine von Schauwenburg (1605)
A Funeral Monument for Catharina Muller (1828)
A Funeral Monument for Anna Maria Fasco (1773)
A Funeral Monument for Pastor Johannes Haüss (17th century)
A Pilaster (12th century)
Culots (Ornamental Strips) (12th century)

Gallery

References

Balbronn
Balbronn
Balbronn
Balbronn